Welbeck Abbey Cricket Ground is a cricket ground at Welbeck Abbey, Nottinghamshire.  The county match on the ground was in 1901, when Nottinghamshire played  Derbyshire in the grounds first first-class match.  The ground held a further first-class match in 1904 when Nottinghamshire played Derbyshire.

References

External links
Welbeck Abbey Cricket Ground on CricketArchive
Welbeck Abbey Cricket Ground on Cricinfo

Cricket grounds in Nottinghamshire
Sports venues completed in 1901